Daniel Nettelbladt (14 January 1719 in Rostock – 4 September 1791 in Halle) was a German jurist and philosopher.

Nettelbladt studied theology and law at the universities of Rostock, Marburg and Halle, where he became a doctor of law in 1744. In 1746 he became a full professor of jurisprudence in Halle, and a royal Prussian privy aulic councillor.

Works
Systema elementare Jurisprudentiae naturalis, 1749
Historie der demonstrativischen Rechtsgelehrtheit, von ihrem Anfang bis auf das Jahr 1745, 1754

References

External links
 

1719 births
1791 deaths
People from Rostock
Academic staff of the Martin Luther University of Halle-Wittenberg
Jurists from Mecklenburg-Western Pomerania
German philosophers
Philosophers of law
18th-century German writers
18th-century jurists
18th-century philosophers
18th-century German male writers